Ho Pui Tsuen or Ho Pui New Village is a village in Tai Wo Hau, Tsuen Wan District, Hong Kong.

Administration
Ho Pui New Village is a recognized village under the New Territories Small House Policy.

History
Ho Pui Tsuen, like the nearby villages of Kwan Mun Hau Tsuen and Yeung Uk Tsuen, is a resite village.

See also
 Tsuen Wan Sam Tsuen

References

Further reading

External links

 Delineation of area of existing village Ho Pui (Tsuen Wan) for election of resident representative (2019 to 2022)

Villages in Tsuen Wan District, Hong Kong